The Second Battle of San Juan occurred on 22 June 1898 when two Spanish vessels tried to break the American blockade off San Juan.

Background
San Juan had been under blockade by American forces since April 1898. Most of the time, the blockade consisted of a single auxiliary cruiser which patrolled and pursued blockade runners that were attempting to reach San Juan. The Spanish destroyer , originally part of Admiral Cervera's squadron, had mechanical trouble and left the main Spanish fleet eventually reaching San Juan. With Terror and several other naval vessels at their disposal, the Spanish decided to make an attempt at breaking the blockade. Terror and the old cruiser  set off from San Juan to engage St. Paul while a crowd of jubilant locals at the harbor cheered them on.

Battle
Almost as soon as the Spanish ships engaged the American vessel, they realized that Isabel II would have to retire, as she was much slower than the American ship. Terror attempted to cover the cruiser's escape with a torpedo attack but was thwarted when fire from St. Paul put her rudder out of action. The ship then turned, which allowed St. Paul to score direct hits near Terrors waterline. These hits disabled one of Terrors engines and caused her to list. Terror then fled the engagement and beached herself on a nearby bank to keep from sinking.

Aftermath
The Spanish sortie had failed. The Americans had inflicted several casualties on the Spanish, put Terror out of action for the rest of the war, and maintained their blockade. The small Spanish squadron was not finished however and would sortie once more later in the war.

References

External links
 Spanish-American War
 History Navy Mil

Battles involving Spain
Naval battles of the Spanish–American War
Military history of Puerto Rico
History of San Juan, Puerto Rico
Conflicts in 1898
June 1898 events
19th century in San Juan, Puerto Rico